Sirianni is a surname. Notable people with the surname include:

 Carmel Sirianni (1922–1991), American politician
 Giuseppe Sirianni (1874–1955), Italian military officer
 Joseph Sirianni (born 1975), Australian tennis player
 Mike Sirianni (born 1972), American football player and coach
 Nick Sirianni (born 1981), American football coach
 Rob Sirianni (born 1983), Canadian-born Italian ice hockey player
 Chuck Sirianni (born 1966), American Supercargo and Dispatcher